Peter Van Gelder (born March 19, 1940) is a sitarist and musician who played saxophone and bass in The Great Society.

Van Gelder moved to San Francisco after college and learned bass to play in The Great Society; he played saxophone on White Rabbit. He became interested in Indian music after working at a San Francisco radio station and took a summer class at University of California Berkeley with Ali Akbar Khan where he learned to play sitar. Deciding to continue his studies with Khan in Kolkata, he lived in India for three years and became a disciple of Ali Akbar Khan. While in India, he met other musicians with whom he formed the band The Saddhu Brand when he returned to California.

He is an instructor at the Ali Akbar College of Music in San Rafael, California.

Early life
Van Gelder grew up in a household where his parents listened to Western classical music. He played clarinet and trumpet as a child.

References

External links
 Official website

Living people
World music musicians
Sitar players
1940 births